Joseph Edward Mulherin (born June 4, 1992), better known by his stage name Nothing,Nowhere (stylized as nothing,nowhere.), is an American singer, rapper, and songwriter.

While the music composed by Mulherin is entirely written and produced by him, he maintains a group of musicians which consist of associates that perform with him for live shows also under the nothing,nowhere. name. The band has toured as a supporting act for Grandson, Real Friends, Tiny Moving Parts, Thrice and La Dispute on multiple tours.

Early life 
Mulherin was raised in Foxborough, Massachusetts, and spent summers in Hyde Park, Vermont. He attended Igo Elementary School and Ahern Middle School. Afterwards, Mulherin spent his freshman year of high school at Xaverian Brothers High School, before transferring to Foxborough High School his sophomore year, where he studied computer-based design.

History

In 2015, Mulherin began uploading songs on SoundCloud under the name nothing,nowhere. In June of that year, he released his debut album titled the nothing,nowhere. LP onto Bandcamp. After releasing two EPs, Bummer, and Who Are You, featuring Austrian producer Oilcolor, on October 20, 2017, he released his commercial debut, Reaper, an album of guitar-based emo rap that the New York Times called "one of the most promising pop albums of the year." He produced the album with Erik Ron and Jay Vee. The track "Hopes Up" features vocals from Chris Carrabba of Dashboard Confessional, and the track "REM" features Delaware rapper Lil West. New York Times music critic Jon Caramanica listed Reaper as his #1 album of 2017.

Mulherin has had several different aliases outside of "nothing,nowhere.", notably: never,forever, TRAU CHOI, & Lil Tofu. never,forever was a side project Mulherin released on SoundCloud. TRAU CHOI was a band between nothing,nowhere. and other associated artists, only releasing a demo song in 2014 and a self-titled ep of 5 tracks on Bandcamp in 2016. Lil Tofu was a parody of stereotypical Soundcloud rapper and emo culture.

On February 16, 2018, it was confirmed that Mulherin had signed to Fueled by Ramen as he released a new single titled "Ruiner", the first of several that would appear on his upcoming album of the same name, which was released on April 13, 2018. In March 2018, Mulherin cancelled his tour due to chronic laryngitis and a hemorrhaged vocal fold, this included his first European show in London.

From October 19 to November 9, 2018, Mulherin was on tour in Europe.

On January 28, 2020, Mulherin released a new single titled "Nightmare", subsequently announcing dates for a world tour. However, these dates were soon cancelled in March of the same year due to complications involving the COVID-19 pandemic. On April 18, 2020, Mulherin released a single titled "Death". On July 10th, 2020, Mulherin released an album titled "One Takes: Vol. 1". The album features versions of songs released prior that were all recorded in one take. Music publication The Line of Best Fit rated it a 7.5/10, calling the album an exposé of "the raw nature of human hurt and understanding". On July 24, 2020, Mulherin released a single titled "Lights (4444)". On September 18, 2020, Mulherin released a single titled "Pretend". On October 5, 2020, Neck Deep announced new dates for their All Distortions Are Intentional US Tour, with Mulherin as a supporting act. On October 27, 2020, Mulherin released a single titled "Blood" featuring indie rock singer KennyHoopla and producer Judge. On December 7, 2020, Mulherin announced his upcoming fourth album, Trauma Factory, which would be released on February 19, 2021. He subsequently released a new single for the album, titled "Fake Friend".

Personal life 
Mulherin has almost never used alcohol, cigarettes or other recreational drugs, and in his freshman year of college, he became vegan straight edge.

In August 2018, Mulherin cancelled a string of shows, including an appearance at Reading & Leeds Festival due to severe anxiety. He had previously canceled shows due to depression and anxiety in July 2018, further revealing he was pursuing treatment. In an interview with The Fader in November 2018, Mulherin disclosed that he had felt anxiety and panic attacks regularly as a child and the effects it had on his life led to depression.

Before creating music, Mulherin had an interest in filmmaking. He attended film school at Burlington College in Vermont and while in college, Mulherin co-created the short film Watcher which won a prize at the Vermont International Film Festival. In 2013, he participated in a contest by the organization Creative Mind Group at the 66th Cannes Film Festival in France, shooting, directing and co-editing the film One Day which received three awards.

Discography

Albums

Extended plays

Music videos
"don't mind me" (2015, The nothing,nowhere. LP)
"poor posture" (2015, The nothing,nowhere. LP)
"i've been doing well" (2015, Bummer)
"i'm sorry, i'm trying" (2015, non-album single)
"deadbeat valentine" (2016, non-album single)
"letdown" (2016,  non-album single)
"clarity in kerosene" (2017, Reaper)
"hopes up" (featuring Dashboard Confessional) (2017, Reaper)
"skully" (2017, Reaper)
"REM" (featuring Lil West) (2017, Reaper)
"waster" (2018, Ruiner)
"ruiner" (2018, Ruiner)
"hammer" (2018, Ruiner)
"rejecter" (2018, Ruiner)
"dread" (2018, non-album single)
"destruction" (2019, bloodlust)
"nightmare" (2020, Trauma Factory)
"death" (2020, Trauma Factory)
"lights (4444)" (2020, Trauma Factory)
”pretend” (2020, Trauma Factory)
"blood" (featuring KennyHoopla & JUDGE) (2020, Trauma Factory)
"fake friend" (2020, Trauma Factory) 
"upside down" (2021,  Trauma Factory )
"Catching Fire" with Sum 41 (2021)
"Deathwish" with Stand Atlantic (2021, F.E.A.R.)
"Pieces of You" (2021,  non-album single)
"MEMORY_FRACTURE" (2022, Void Eternal)
"M1SERY_SYNDROME" (2022, Void Eternal)
"CYAN1DE" (featuring Pete Wentz) (2022, Void Eternal)
"THIRST4VIOLENCE" (featuring Freddie Dredd & Silverstein) (2023, Void Eternal)

References

External links

 nothing,nowhere. on SoundCloud

1992 births
Alternative hip hop musicians
Burlington College alumni
Decaydance Records artists
Emo rap musicians
Fueled by Ramen artists
Living people
People from Foxborough, Massachusetts
People from Burlington, Vermont
Rappers from Massachusetts
Rappers from Vermont
21st-century American rappers
Equal Vision Records artists